John Yngve Adolf Engkvist (18 February 1918 in Stockholm, Sweden – 26 August 1982 in Ekerö, Sweden) was a Swedish Olympic sailor in the Star class. He competed in the 1948 Summer Olympics together with Bengt Melin, where they finished 17th.

References

Olympic sailors of Sweden
Swedish male sailors (sport)
Star class sailors
Sailors at the 1948 Summer Olympics – Star
1918 births
1982 deaths
Sportspeople from Stockholm